Sabatinca heighwayi is a species of moth belonging to the family Micropterigidae. It was described by Alfred Philpott in 1927 and is endemic to New Zealand. It can be found north of Lewis Pass in the north west of the South Island. Adult moths are on the wing from late September until the middle of January. The host of the larvae of this species is the foliose liverwort Plagiochila circumcincta.

Taxonomy 
This species was described by Alfred Philpott in 1927 using two female specimens collected by Mr W. Heighway at the Leslie Valley, Mount Arthur Tableland in November, 1915. The holotype specimen is held at the New Zealand Arthropod Collection.

Original description

Philpott described the adults of the species as follows:

This moth is one of the larger New Zealand endemic species within the genus Sabatinca and has a forewing band pattern of light bands surrounded by dark bands.

Distribution
This species is endemic to New Zealand and can be found north of Lewis Pass in the north west of the South Island.

Behaviour 
Adult moths are on the wing from late September until the middle of January. This species is regarded as being very elusive.

Host species and habitat 
The host of the larvae of this species is the foliose liverwort Plagiochila circumcincta. S. heighwayi pupates during the winter months.

References

Micropterigidae
Moths described in 1927
Endemic fauna of New Zealand
Moths of New Zealand
Taxa named by Alfred Philpott
Endemic moths of New Zealand